Brenton James Sanderson (born 27 February 1974) is a former Australian rules football player and is the former senior coach of the Adelaide Football Club in the Australian Football League (AFL).

Career

Early career
Originally from Adelaide, South Australia, Sanderson moved from Sturt to Adelaide as one of their 10 concession picks. While at Sturt he injured his right leg and had to learn to kick left footed, this subsequently became his primary kicking foot. He played just 4 games with the club following two hamstring injuries during the year, but Sanderson once said he learned a lot about the right attitude to preparation and training, as he learned from living with Nathan Buckley.

Geelong
He had his best season in 2001, when he took out the Carji Greeves Medal as well as earning International rules selection.

In 2005 before the finals series, Sanderson announced he would be retiring from AFL football. His last match was the semi-final loss to the Sydney Swans at the SCG.

Coaching career

Port Adelaide Football Club assistant coach (2005-2007)
Immediately after Sanderson's retirement from playing he moved back to Adelaide to become an assistant coach at Port Adelaide Football Club in 2005 under senior coach Mark Williams,

Geelong Football Club assistant coach (2007-2011)
Sanderson then headed back to Geelong to become an assistant coach under senior coach Mark Thompson in 2007.

Adelaide Football Club senior coach (2011-2014)
On Monday 19 September 2011, Sanderson was appointed senior coach of the Adelaide Football Club ahead of red hot favourite Scott Burns and premiership captain Mark Bickley. Sanderson replaced caretaker senior coach Mark Bickley, who replaced Neil Craig after Craig resigned in the middle of the 2011 season.  

After getting to within a goal of reaching the AFL Grand Final in 2012, the Crows underachieved in the ensuing two years, finishing 11th and 10th respectively and therefore failing to make the finals. As a result, on 17 September 2014 (almost three years to the day since he was appointed) Sanderson was sacked as senior coach of the Adelaide Crows. He left the Crows having won 39 of his 69 games in charge – a 56.5 per cent success rate – the second-best of any Crows coach to date. Sanderson was then replaced by Phil Walsh as Adelaide Football Club senior coach.

AFL National Academy Head coach (2015-2016)
Sanderson was Head Coach at the AFL National Academy from 2015 to 2016.

Collingwood Football Club assistant coach (2016-2021)
In 2016, Sanderson was appointed as a Senior Assistant Coach at the Collingwood Football Club under senior coach Nathan Buckley, overseeing forward line and ball movement. Sanderson left the Collingwood Football Club at the end of the 2021 season.

Personal life
Sanderson was at the Sari Club, just hours before the 2002 Bali bombings killed 202 people.  He is also a qualified pilot.

Statistics

Playing statistics

|-
|- style="background-color: #EAEAEA"
! scope="row" style="text-align:center" | 1992
|style="text-align:center;"|
| 36 || 4 || 3 || 2 || 25 || 26 || 51 || 9 || 3 || 0.8 || 0.5 || 6.3 || 6.5 || 12.8 || 2.3 || 0.8
|-
! scope="row" style="text-align:center" | 1993
|style="text-align:center;"|
| 36 || 2 || 1 || 1 || 11 || 13 || 24 || 7 || 2 || 0.5 || 0.5 || 5.5 || 6.5 || 12.0 || 3.5 || 1.0
|- style="background-color: #EAEAEA"
! scope="row" style="text-align:center" | 1994
|style="text-align:center;"|
| 17 || 4 || 1 || 0 || 20 || 17 || 37 || 9 || 3 || 0.3 || 0.0 || 5.0 || 4.3 || 9.3 || 2.3 || 0.8
|-
! scope="row" style="text-align:center" | 1995
|style="text-align:center;"|
| 27 || 13 || 2 || 0 || 60 || 57 || 117 || 42 || 7 || 0.2 || 0.0 || 4.6 || 4.4 || 9.0 || 3.2 || 0.5
|- style="background-color: #EAEAEA"
! scope="row" style="text-align:center" | 1996
|style="text-align:center;"|
| 27 || 21 || 2 || 2 || 224 || 124 || 348 || 101 || 23 || 0.1 || 0.1 || 10.7 || 5.9 || 16.6 || 4.8 || 1.1
|-
! scope="row" style="text-align:center" | 1997
|style="text-align:center;"|
| 27 || 21 || 8 || 6 || 205 || 81 || 286 || 84 || 29 || 0.4 || 0.3 || 9.8 || 3.9 || 13.6 || 4.0 || 1.4
|- style="background-color: #EAEAEA"
! scope="row" style="text-align:center" | 1998
|style="text-align:center;"|
| 27 || 22 || 5 || 3 || 291 || 98 || 389 || 102 || 33 || 0.2 || 0.1 || 13.2 || 4.5 || 17.7 || 4.6 || 1.5
|-
! scope="row" style="text-align:center" | 1999
|style="text-align:center;"|
| 27 || 15 || 4 || 5 || 204 || 55 || 259 || 81 || 14 || 0.3 || 0.3 || 13.6 || 3.7 || 17.3 || 5.4 || 0.9
|- style="background-color: #EAEAEA"
! scope="row" style="text-align:center" | 2000
|style="text-align:center;"|
| 27 || 23 || 1 || 0 || 247 || 102 || 349 || 107 || 29 || 0.0 || 0.0 || 10.7 || 4.4 || 15.2 || 4.7 || 1.3
|-
! scope="row" style="text-align:center" | 2001
|style="text-align:center;"|
| 27 || 22 || 2 || 1 || 240 || 98 || 338 || 104 || 29 || 0.1 || 0.0 || 10.9 || 4.5 || 15.4 || 4.7 || 1.3
|- style="background-color: #EAEAEA"
! scope="row" style="text-align:center" | 2002
|style="text-align:center;"|
| 27 || 12 || 1 || 1 || 105 || 40 || 145 || 48 || 24 || 0.1 || 0.1 || 8.8 || 3.3 || 12.1 || 4.0 || 2.0
|-
! scope="row" style="text-align:center" | 2003
|style="text-align:center;"|
| 27 || 22 || 2 || 0 || 264 || 120 || 384 || 116 || 38 || 0.1 || 0.0 || 12.0 || 5.5 || 17.5 || 5.3 || 1.7
|- style="background-color: #EAEAEA"
! scope="row" style="text-align:center" | 2004
|style="text-align:center;"|
| 27 || 17 || 1 || 0 || 147 || 74 || 221 || 76 || 21 || 0.1 || 0.0 || 8.6 || 4.4 || 13.0 || 4.5 || 1.2
|-
! scope="row" style="text-align:center" | 2005
|style="text-align:center;"|
| 27 || 11 || 1 || 2 || 93 || 77 || 170 || 64 || 20 || 0.1 || 0.2 || 8.5 || 7.0 || 15.5 || 5.8 || 1.8
|- class="sortbottom"
! colspan=3| Career
! 209
! 34
! 23
! 2136
! 982
! 3118
! 950
! 275
! 0.2
! 0.1
! 10.2
! 4.7
! 14.9
! 4.5
! 1.3
|}

Head coaching record

References

External links

Adelaide Football Club players
Collingwood Football Club players
Geelong Football Club players
Carji Greeves Medal winners
Sturt Football Club players
Australian rules footballers from Adelaide
1974 births
Living people
Adelaide Football Club coaches